Ordinary Decent Criminal is a 2000 crime comedy film, directed by Thaddeus O'Sullivan, written by Gerard Stembridge, and stars Kevin Spacey and Linda Fiorentino. The film is loosely based on the story of Martin Cahill, a famous Irish crime boss.

Filmed in late 1998 and originally scheduled for a fall 1999 release, the movie was put out overseas first the following year but it never got a proper theatrical release in the United States, where it was released straight to video in January 2003, almost five years after filming began.

Plot 
Michael Lynch is one of Dublin's most notorious criminals. He has two wives, sisters Christine and Lisa, as well as many children. When he is not spending time with his family, he is plotting heists with his gang. His actions make him an iconic figure, and he has a rapport with the general public despite being a criminal.

During his elaborate heists, he concentrates on the showmanship as much as the crime itself. He pulls off a daring art theft, stealing several priceless paintings from Dublin's best art gallery, giving the  authorities the slip. The Gardaí become more determined to catch him as time goes on, in particular Noel Quigley, an officer whose ambition to catch Lynch becomes an obsession. His actions also gain the ire of the IRA.

Lynch finds himself in trouble when he is unable to sell a stolen Caravaggio painting, The Taking of Christ, giving Quigley the opportunity he was waiting for to try and catch him. Lynch is forced to go on the run, with his popularity with the public at stake.

Cast 
 Kevin Spacey as Michael Lynch
 Linda Fiorentino as Christine Lynch
 Peter Mullan as Stevie
 Stephen Dillane as Noel Quigley
 Helen Baxendale as Lisa Lynch
 David Hayman as Tony Brady
 Patrick Malahide as Commissioner Daly
 Gerard McSorley as Harrison
 David Kelly as Father Grogan
 Gary Lydon as Tom Rooney
 Paul Ronan as Billy Lynch
 Colin Farrell as Alec
 Vincent Regan as Shay Kirby
 Tim Loane as Jerome Higgins
 Christoph Waltz as Peter
 Enda Oates as Brian
 David Brady as Declan Brady
 Mike Diamente as James Mason
 Jeffrey Connon as Paul O'Keeffe
 Bill Murphy as Detective Barry

Production 

Thaddeus O'Sullivan began trying to adapt the book The General by Paul Williams, but abandoned a direct adaption. Having previously worked on Nothing Personal about loyalist paramilitaries, and a biopic about John Gotti for NBC, O'Sullivan did not want to again work under the factual and legal constraints of a film based on real people, and was more interested in making a comedy or caper, and instead they developed their own story only loosely based on Martin Cahill. The original project went back on the market and John Boorman came on board as director. O'Sullivan was worried that investors might think the two projects were too similar, but after Boorman's The General screened at Cannes people saw the films were very different and were willing to invest.

O'Sullivan would have cast more Irish actors except for Boorman's film, and said "If his part had not been so prominent in The General, I would have had Seán McGinley in my film. I'd have him in every film." 
He felt it was necessary to cast recognizable named stars to stand the best chance of recouping the film's $10 million budget, and was ultimately pleased with what he described as a "dream cast".

Having seen Colin Farrell in a play at London's Donmar Warehouse Theatre, Spacey invited him to appear in one of his films, and convinced director O'Sullivan to cast him.

Reception 

 
The film received negative reviews from critics. On Rotten Tomatoes the film has an approval rating of 14% based on reviews from 7 critics.

Christopher Null writing for Filmcritic.com gave it 1.5 out of 5 wrote: "I can only imagine one thing worse than Kevin Spacey trying on an Irish accent, and that's sultry Linda Fiorentino doing the same thing." Though critical of the accents, he says the biggest problem is the dull and less than ordinary script.

Derek Elley of Variety magazine called it "an ordinary, decent movie. Neither an embarrassment nor a triumph, tedious nor gripping". Elley praised the cast but compared it unfavorable with John Boorman's 1998 film The General.

Music

Soundtrack 
 "One Day At a Time" – Damon Albarn and Robert Del Naja
 "Kevin on a Motorbike" – Damon Albarn
 "Superfinger" – Lowfinger
 "Mother of Pearl" – Bryan Ferry
 "I Want You" – Shack
 "Gopher Mambo" – Yma Sumac
 "Chase After Gallery" – Damon Albarn
 "Eurodisco" – Bis
 "Bank Job" – Damon Albarn
 "Dying Isn't Easy" – Damon Albarn

Home media 
 
Ordinary Decent Criminal was released on DVD on 31 January 2003.

References 

2000 films
Irish crime comedy films
Irish heist films
English-language Irish films
2000s heist films
2000s crime comedy films
Films set in Dublin (city)
Films shot in Dublin (city)
Films about organised crime in Ireland
Icon Productions films
Films directed by Thaddeus O'Sullivan
2000s English-language films